The Sumathi Best Teledrama Series Award is presented annually in Sri Lanka by the Sumathi Group of Companies, and is  associated with many commercial brands for the best Sri Lankan teledrama series of the year on the television screen.

The award was first given in 1995. The following is a list of the winners of this prestigious title since then.

References

Teledrama